Lethyna aequabilis is a species of tephritid or fruit flies in the genus Lethyna of the family Tephritidae.

Distribution
Uganda, Kenya, Tanzania.

References

Tephritinae
Insects described in 1957
Diptera of Africa